甌 can refer to:

 Jian'ou
 Dong'ou
 Wenzhou, modern city on the Dong'ou location
 Cup of Solid Gold (鞏金甌), national anthem of the Qing dynasty
 Âu Lạc